Agostino Barelli (Baptized 26 October 1627, Bologna – c. 29 January 1697, Bologna) was an Italian architect of the Baroque.

Biography
Barelli is noted for introducing Italian Baroque architecture to Bavaria. He was invited to Munich by Henriette Adelaide of Savoy to construct the Theatinerkirche in 1664. The work was marked by conflicts with the construction supervisor Spinelli. Barelli created also the draft for Nymphenburg Palace in 1664. He was replaced by Enrico Zuccalli in 1674 and returned to Bologna.

Chief works

 San Bartolomeo Theatine Church, Bologna (1653)
 Theatinerkirche (Munich) (1664-1674)
 Nymphenburg Palace (1664-1674)
 Papal Rooms of the Munich Residence (ca. 1666)

References

1627 births
1680s deaths
17th-century Italian architects
Italian Baroque architects
Architects of the Bavarian court
Architects from Bologna